The Sol Yaris is a Brazilian single-place paraglider that was designed and produced by Sol Paragliders of Jaraguá do Sul in the mid-2000s. It is now out of production.

Design and development
The Yaris was designed as an intermediate glider. The models are each named for their relative size.

Variants
Yaris S
Small-sized model for lighter pilots. The glider model is AFNOR Standard certified.
Yaris M
Mid-sized model for medium-weight pilots. The glider model is AFNOR Standard certified.
Yaris L
Large-sized model for heavier pilots. The glider model is AFNOR Standard certified.
Yaris XL
Extra large-sized model for much heavier pilots. The glider model is AFNOR Standard certified.

Specifications (Yaris M)

References

Yaris
Paragliders